Aleksander Petrov  is a Bulgarian runner. He competed in the 2002 European Athletics Indoor Championships – Men's 200 metres on 1 March 2002, with a time of 21.41 in heat 1, not qualifying for the finals or semi-finals.

References

Bulgarian male sprinters
Living people
Year of birth missing (living people)
Place of birth missing (living people)
21st-century Bulgarian people